Independence High School is a public high school in Ashburn, Virginia, and is part of Loudoun County Public Schools. Opening its doors to students for the first time in 2019, Independence High School serves the communities of Ashburn and Brambleton.

Administration 
Independence High School is headed by John G. Gabriel, a 2017 semi-finalist for The Washington Post Principal of the year. Gabriel was previously the principal of John Champe High School, and an assistant principal at Park View High School.

Athletics 
Independence High School's mascot is a tiger and its sports teams currently play in the 3A Dulles District. Independence AD is Ryan Rogers who came from Heritage to open up the school in 2019. Independence offers competitive cheer, cross country, field hockey, football, golf, gymnastics, indoor and outdoor track, girls' volleyball, basketball, wrestling, swimming, baseball, soccer, softball and tennis.

External links 
 Independence High School website
 Independence High School athletics

References 

Public high schools in Virginia
Schools in Loudoun County, Virginia
Educational institutions established in 2019
2019 establishments in Virginia